RE2 may refer to:

 Bajaj Auto RE2 Three wheeler
 Resident Evil 2, 1998 survival horror video game
 Resident Evil 2 (2019 video game), 2019 remake of the 1998 video game
 Resident Evil: Apocalypse, 2004 horror film, second in the film franchise
 RE2 (software), a regular expression software library
 Boulder Valley School District (or district Re2) in Boulder, Colorado
 Texas Recreational Road 2 (or RE2), Texas RE2 in  Val Verde County
 Rhein-Haard-Express (RE 2), German train service